Joshua Bekenstein is an American businessman and co-chairman of Bain Capital.

Education and personal life
Bekenstein graduated from Yale University in 1980 with a Bachelor of Arts (B.A.). 
He then graduated from Harvard Business School with a Master of Business Administration (MBA) degree in 1984.

Since earning his degrees, Bekenstein has stayed active with Yale, serving on the Board of Advisors of the Yale School of Management, the Yale Investment Committee, an at-large member of the University Council, the co-chair of the Yale Tomorrow Campaign, and a member of the Yale Development Council. He was also appointed as a new successor trustee of the Yale Corporation in 2013.

Career
Bekenstein worked at Bain & Company following his graduation from Yale where he worked with companies in a variety of industries. He joined Bain Capital at its founding in 1984 and became a managing director in 1986. He was named co-chairman of the firm in 2016.
 
Bekenstein serves as a board member of Gymboree Corporation, Dollarama, Toys "R" Us, Bombardier Recreational Products, Michaels Stores, Burlington Coat Factory, Waters Corporation and Bright Horizons Family Solutions.

Philanthropy
Bekenstein currently serves as a co-chair on the Board of Directors of New Profit Inc., a Boston-based venture philanthropy fund and as a member on the Board of Trustees of the Pan-Mass Challenge, an annual bike-athon that crosses the Commonwealth of Massachusetts to raise money for the Dana–Farber Cancer Institute, where Bekenstein serves as chairman of the Board of Trustees. Bekenstein co-chaired Dana-Farbers “Mission Possible” campaign that hit its goal to raise $1 billion a year early in September 2009. Bekenstein also chairs the board of Be The Change, is a board member of City Year, Opportunity Nation, and New Leaders. He also contributes to Horizons for Homeless Children, Year Up, Teach for America, Kipp Schools, and Boston Children’s Hospital.
 
In 2010, the National Association of Corporate Directors named Bekenstein Nonprofit Director of the Year.

References

American financial businesspeople
Harvard Business School alumni
Living people
Yale University alumni
Year of birth missing (living people)
Bain Capital people
Bain & Company employees
American chief executives of financial services companies
People from Wayland, Massachusetts